Arson Gang Busters is a 1938 American action film directed by Joseph Kane and written by Alex Gottlieb, Norman Burnstine and Joseph Hoffman. The film stars Robert Livingston, Rosalind Keith, Jackie Moran, Warren Hymer, Jack La Rue and Clay Clement. The film was released on March 28, 1938, by Republic Pictures.

Plot
Fireman Bill O'Connell is allocated in the Arson Squad with the objective of stopping a gang of for-profit arsonists who are causing property and lives to be lost.

Cast 
Robert Livingston as Bill O'Connell 
Rosalind Keith as Joan Lawrence
Jackie Moran as Jimmy Riler
Warren Hymer as Tom Jones
Jack La Rue as Bud Morgan
Clay Clement as Hamilton
Selmer Jackson as Commissioner Benton
Emory Parnell as Chief J.P. Riley
Walter Sande as Oscar
Dick Wessel as Slugs
Jack Rice as Bradbury
Lloyd Whitlock as Martin

References

External links
 

1938 films
American action films
1930s action films
Republic Pictures films
Films directed by Joseph Kane
American black-and-white films
1930s English-language films
1930s American films